"Can I Kick It?" is a 1990 song by American hip hop group A Tribe Called Quest, released as the third single from their debut album, People's Instinctive Travels and the Paths of Rhythm (1990). The song, which has a call and response chorus, was recorded in 1989, when the band members were aged 18-19.

The song contains samples of "Walk on the Wild Side" by Lou Reed, "What a Waste" by Ian Dury and the Blockheads, "Spinning Wheel" by Dr. Lonnie Smith, "Dance of the Knights" by Sergei Prokofiev and "Sunshower" by Dr. Buzzard's Original Savannah Band. Phife Dawg has stated that, because of the use of the "Walk on the Wild Side" sample, the group did not receive any money from the single, with Lou Reed instead claiming the profits.

"Can I Kick It?", considered one of the group's  signature songs, appears on the band's 1999 compilation album, The Anthology, with the outro of "Bonita Applebum" added to the beginning of the song. In 2012, NME listed the song at number 90 in their ranking of the "100 Best Songs of the 1990s".

Critical reception
Larry Flick from Billboard stated that "inspired use of samples from Lou Reed's 'Walk on the Wild Side' nicely complements Tribe's relaxed and confident rhyming." A reviewer from Music & Media noted that "the New York rap crew proves their music can be 'double -streetwise'" and described the song as "two-dimensional rap". NME called it a "laidback chant-a-long". Gary Crossing from Record Mirror wrote, "You can't go far wrong with this groovy little shanty. Take a dash of Lou Reed's 'Walk on the Wild Side', a splash of Ian Dury's 'What A Waste', a sprinkling of rap and a pinch of Seventies funk to create this masterpiece of contemporary popular music." Caroline Sullivan from Smash Hits said that "they've had the sense to nick the bassline from the elderly rock hit 'Walk on the Wild Side', and it gives their effort a bit of slinky class."

Music video
The accompanying music video for "Can I Kick It?" was directed by American music video director and video editor Jim Swaffield. It features A Tribe Called Quest and various others, including members of De La Soul, literally kicking the word "it" while rapping on a film set, a park (located under the Williamsburg Bridge in New York’s Lower East Side), and a construction site. On the film set, they are seen playing with the tittle of the "i" in "it". In the park, they are walking around and are flipping on top of the "it". The video also features the participants throwing drumsticks around and landing them on drums. A "flying record player" is featured, to play the Lou Reed sample. Additionally, the "Can I Kick It? (Spirit Mix)", which uses a different beat, plays throughout the video.

Impact and legacy
In 2012, NME listed "Can I Kick It?" at number 90 in their ranking of the 100 Best Songs of the 1990s. In 2021, Rolling Stone included it in their list of The 500 Greatest Songs of All Time at No. 292. 

In 2022, Pitchfork ranked it at number 25 in their list of The 250 Best Songs of the 1990s.

The song was featured on the soundtrack to Tony Hawk's Pro Skater 1 + 2, a remaster of the first 2 Tony Hawk games Tony Hawk’s Pro Skater and Tony Hawk’s Pro Skater 2, and the trailer of Teenage Mutant Ninja Turtles: Mutant Mayhem.

Track listing

Charts

Certifications

Popular culture
In the second verse, Phife Dawg refers to former New York City mayor David Dinkins, the city's first African-American mayor: "Mr. Dinkins, would you please be my mayor?"  The song was recorded before Dinkins' was elected to office.
It was used in a Michelob Ultra commercial for the Super Bowl LV
It was used on the opening scene of the 2021 film Tom & Jerry, featuring pigeons lip synching to the lyrics of the song as they are flying in New York City.
The song appears in Season 2 of “Last Chance U: Basketball”
The song was used in the first trailer for the film Teenage Mutant Ninja Turtles: Mutant Mayhem.

References

1989 songs
1990 singles
A Tribe Called Quest songs
Jive Records singles
Music Week number-one dance singles
Song recordings produced by Q-Tip (musician)
Songs written by Ali Shaheed Muhammad
Songs written by Lou Reed
Songs about New York City
Jazz rap songs